Tom French is a former president of the Workers' Party and former member of Craigavon Borough Council.

Born in Lurgan in 1934, French joined Sinn Féin as a youth and remained with the party as it evolved into the Workers' Party.

Early life
After attending teacher training college, he became a schoolteacher in Lurgan, County Armagh. He was an early recruit to the Northern Ireland Civil Rights Association and participated in many of its civil rights marches throughout Northern Ireland in the late 1960s. When Sinn Féin split in 1970, French supported the Official wing and was a member of its first Publicity Committee. Much later, he became a founding member of the Peace Train Organisation, which was formed to oppose the Provisional IRA's bombing of the Dublin to Belfast railway line.

Political career
French worked closely beside Malachy McGurran who was a major figure in the northern republican movement from the late 1950s and a Vice-President of Official Sinn Féin. French was heavily involved in McGurran's various election campaigns and when McGurran died in 1978, French won the local by-election to fill his seat on Craigavon Borough Council. He remained a councillor, alternating between representing the Loughside and Craigavon Central areas, until 1993 when he lost his seat. He also unsuccessfully contested Armagh in the 1982 Assembly election and subsequent 1983 by-election and contested one of its successor constituencies, Upper Bann at every election from its creation in 1983 until 2005. His best result was the 19% which he polled in the 1986 by-election where he was the only candidate opposing the sitting MP. In 1996 he was an unsuccessful candidate in the Northern Ireland Forum election in Upper Bann.

He was a member of the Ard Comhairle / Central Executive Committee of the Workers' Party for many years. In 1992, he was elected Chairman of the Workers' Party in the North and in 1996 was elected to the position of Party President, replacing Marian Donnelly. He retired from that position in 2000 and was replaced by Seán Garland. He stepped down from the Ard Comhairle some years later.

Personal life
An avid opera lover and considered to have a fine singing voice, Tom French participated in the Wexford Opera Festival on several occasions.

References

1934 births
Living people
Members of Craigavon Borough Council
Workers' Party (Ireland) politicians
Irish Marxists
Politicians from Belfast
People from Lurgan